Michael Cammarata (born December 26, 1985) is an American entrepreneur, investor, and wellness industry executive. He is president and chief executive officer of Neptune Wellness Solutions, a Canadian/American wellness company  and the co-founder and former chief executive officer of Schmidt’s Naturals, an all-natural personal care company acquired by Unilever in 2017. Cammarata also operates the venture capital fund Random Occurrence.

Early life 
A native of Long Island, New York, Cammarata was diagnosed with dyslexia as a child and had difficulties in school. In elementary school, he spent many hours playing StarCraft on his home computer and developed an aptitude for gaming, computers, and the internet. At the age of 13, he started his first business, a web hosting company, EzzHosting, on a dedicated server he purchased with $2,000 he earned from his older brother. The company’s sites served 5 million unique monthly viewers; That year, Cammarata made his first million dollars.

Cammarata developed one of the first internet message boards, Ultraboard, also known as UB and UB2K. Ultraboard first launched in 1996 and was one of the first message boards to use PHP. It was also used by the popular video game Counter-Strike.

Cammarata released the first video game music video, which was one of the most downloaded files on GameSpy in 2001; Diablo II/Gangsters Paradise music video and Starcraft/Limp Bizkit music video by GamingMV

At 15, Cammarata launched a second business, an online advertising network.  He gave away websites for free to sell internet ads. He was involved in Cox Interactive (digital ad sales) and AdCritic.com, which became part of Ad Age. By age 20, he had generated $85 million in revenue. He chose to forgo college to focus on his businesses.

Career

Big Time Rush 
In 2009, Cammarata transitioned from technology into the music industry, managing the teen boy band Big Time Rush. The group’s first album, BTR, debuted at number 3 on the Billboard 200 in October 2010. The band’s musicians were simultaneously featured in a hit television series, which ran from 2009-2013 on Nickelodeon. Cammarata managed the band through his company CMI Entertainment group. In 2012, CMI announced the production of the animated film The Great Migration starring lead singer Kendall Schmidt.

Cammarata was an associate producer for the reality television series Knockout from 2014-2016.

Schmidt’s Naturals 
In 2013, Cammarata started an investment fund, Random Occurrence (originally KM Organics Fund). As a band manager, Cammarata had observed a desire among fans for all-natural personal care products.  The following year, Cammarata set out to begin investing in the natural products space. In 2014 he met Jamie Schmidt, a creator of natural deodorant products based in Portland, Oregon, and invested in her.

In January 2015, Cammarata and Schmidt officially incorporated Schmidt’s Deodorant Company, LLC (SDC) and launched the company as co-founders and co-chief executive officers. Over the next few years, Cammarata worked closely with Schmidt, growing SDC from 4 employees in a 1,200-square-foot kitchen to a 30,000-square-foot manufacturing facility. Cammarata drove the product's rebranding, manufacturing, digital marketing, and expansion into retailers, including Target, Walgreens, Kroger, and Whole Foods, while Schmidt focused on the product. In early 2017, Cammarata and Schmidt were finalists in the EY Entrepreneur of the Year 2017 Awards for the Pacific Northwest Region.

By 2017, Schmidt’s Deodorant Company had 160 employees, and sold its products in over 14,000 stores in 30 countries worldwide. Later that year, SDC rebranded as Schmidt’s Naturals and was acquired by British-Dutch consumer products conglomerate Unilever in a 9-figure exit.

Post-acquisition, Cammarata stayed on as global chief executive officer of Schmidt’s, stewarding the brand’s growth of 300% before the end of 2018. During his tenure, he introduced a sensitive-skin version of the deodorant in partnership with pop star Justin Bieber called “Here + Now”  and a Lily of the Valley-scented deodorant with environmentalist Jane Goodall.

Neptune Wellness Solutions 
In July 2019, Cammarata joined Neptune Wellness Solutions, the publicly traded American/Canadian cannabinoid extraction and integrated wellness company, as president and chief executive officer. Shortly after joining Neptune, Cammarata helped Neptune raise $41 million through a private stock placement with new and existing institutional investors.

In February 2020, Cammarata launched Neptune’s first two consumer wellness brands, Forest Remedies and Ocean Remedies. In honor of the brand launch, Cammarata rang the NASDAQ exchange’s closing bell on February 20, 2020.

In April 2020, Cammarata submitted to the U.S. FDA registration to commercialize hand-sanitizers in the wake of Covid-19. In May, they announced the distribution of contactless thermometers, in June, pulse oximeters, and in August, disinfectant wipes.

In April, Cammarata again partnered with friend and conservationist Jane Goodall to develop a new line of plant-based products, including essential oils.

In December, Cammarata launched the companies third consumer brand, Mood Ring, in Canada.

In June of 2022, Neptune Wellness Soluntions announced a reverse stock split of 35 to 1,  and the divestiture of its cannabis business.

Under Cammarata's leadership, Neptune Wellness Solutions's market capitalization fell from a peak of $530 million on July 30, 2019, to $5.09 million as of December 14, 2022.

Personal life 
Cammarata lives in Jupiter, Florida. He has a Siberian Husky named Rico.

References 

1985 births
American investors
American people of Italian descent
Living people